Black Diamond Steamship Company (BDSC) was a passengers and cargo Liners of New York City.  The Black Diamond Steamship Corporation was founded by J.E. Dockendorff in 1919. First called the American Diamond Line which cargo routes were between New York to Rotterdam and Antwerp by the United States Shipping Board. The company was profitable in the 1920s and early 1930s.  Before the United States entered World War II, the US's neutrality, ended much of the lines trade. Dockendorff stepped down as a principal executive in 1934. In 1934 he sold the only ship he had the SS New Britain which he had purchased in 1918, the other 20 ships were government owned. During World War II the company sold most of its American Diamond Line ships and moved to charter shipping.  During World War II Black Diamond Steamship Company was active with charter shipping with the Maritime Commission and War Shipping Administration. During wartime, the Black Diamond Steamship Company operated Victory ships and Liberty ships. The ship was run by its crew and the US Navy supplied United States Navy Armed Guards to man the deck guns and radio. The most common armament mounted on these merchant ships were the MK II 20mm Oerlikon autocannon and the 3"/50, 4"/50, and 5"/38 deck guns.  After the war there were many surplus ships and much competitions. Black Diamond Steamship Company continued to operated after the war, but closed in the 1955.

American Diamond Lines
American Diamond Line was started at the end of World War I in 1919, by the United States Shipping Board. American Diamond Lines became a subsidiary of Black Diamond Steamship Company in 1920, a profitable company in the 1920s and early 1930s that operated 20 ships. In 1929 the American Diamond Line was put up for sale. Two companies lobbied the US Shipping Board for American Diamond Lines: Black Diamond Shipping Corporation and the Cosmopolitan Shipping Company. The lobby and appeals were taken all the way to President Herbert Hoover. Then in 1931 the Shipping Board sided with Black Diamond Steamship Corporation, which purchased back American Diamond Lines. Due to the USA's neutrality in early war years, American Diamond Lines charted some of its ships to foreign-flag shipping companies in order to continue its European trade. American Diamond Lines was not able to get Government subsidies post World War II and declined, closing in 1955 as part of Black Diamond Steamship.

Black Diamond Steamship Company Ltd.
Black Diamond Steamship Company Ltd of Montreal was the Canadian subsidiary Black Diamond Steamship Company starting in 1926. The company began in 1881 and was owned by the Dominion Coal Company's Dominion Shipping Company Ltd., which was founded in 1893. Black Diamond Steamship Company Ltd and the Dominion Coal Company continued their partnership. In 1934 Dominion Shipping Co. Ltd. was taken over by Donaldson Bros. & Black Ltd., a  British company, this control ended after World War 2. Black Diamond Steamship Company Ltd. closed in 1965, all ships being sold or scrapped due to age. N

Ports of call
First Ruotes was Boston and New York to/from Antwerp, Rotterdam, AmsterdamAmsterdam.
Black Diamond Steamship Company had weekly routes to Charlottetown, Montreal, Sydney, and St. John's. Also served the cities of: Philadelphia, Boston, Baltimore, and Norfolk / Newport News.

Ships

Black Diamond Steamship and American Diamond Lines ships:
SS New Britain (built in 1919, sank in 1942 ad SS Silver Sword) 
U.S. Shipping Board ships:
SS Anaconda, (built in 1919 at 380 tons, hull# 16, built at Federal Shipbuilding yard)
SS Ambridge  (Built in 1919 at Federal S.B. Yard)
SS West Eldara 
SS Black Falcon (was SS Mary Luckenbach and USS Sac City)
SS Black Gull  (sank off Long Island after a fire on July 21, 1952, crew saved)
SS Black Osprey  (was West Arrow)
SS Back Dragon (was Muncie Victory) 
SS Black Condor (was Empire Lapwing sank in 1941 as the Belgian Fighter)
SS  Black Eagle (built 1920, sank in 1942 as SS Hoosier) 
SS Black Eagle (built 1945 was Midland Victory)
SS Black Tern  (then Empire Hawk)
SS Black Heron (then Empire Barracuda)

World War II chartered ships:
World War II Victory Ships:
SS Union Victory
Towanda Victory
Hobart Victory 
Drake Victory 
SS Luray Victory
North Platte Victory 
Coe Victory 
World War II Liberty Ships:
Kerkyra
R. J. Reynolds 
Robert Dale Owen
Robert Watchorn
Patrick S. Mahoney
Paul Hamilton
Peregrine White 
James Sprunt
Joe C. S. Blackburn 
John P. Harris 
William R. Lewis
William F. Jerman
William L. Watson
Frank J. Cuhel 
SS Howard Gray
Abram S. Hewitt
Augustus Saint-Gaudens
Morris C. Feinstone

References

Defunct shipping companies of the United States
Transport companies established in 1919
Transport companies disestablished in 1919
American companies established in 1919
1919 establishments in New York (state)
1955 disestablishments in New York (state)